Budhwal is a village in the Mahendragarh district of the Indian state of Haryana near the state border with Rajasthan. Its Hindi name is बूढवाल.

References

Villages in Mahendragarh district